The music for the 2013 action-adventure video game Grand Theft Auto V, developed by Rockstar North and published by Rockstar Games, was composed by The Alchemist, Oh No and Tangerine Dream in collaboration with Woody Jackson. The game is the first entry in the Grand Theft Auto series to make use of an original score. In collaboration with each other, the musicians produced over twenty hours of music which scores the game's missions. Some of the works produced by the musicians throughout the game's development influenced some of the in-game missions and sparked inspiration for further score development. Grand Theft Auto V also has an in-game radio that can tune into sixteen stations playing more than 441 tracks of licensed music, as well as two talk radio stations. The composers of the score wanted it to accompany the licensed music, as opposed to detracting from it.

The game's music has been released on three official soundtracks: The Music of Grand Theft Auto V, released alongside the initial launch of the game, consists of three volumes comprising the score, and selections from the in-game radio; The Cinematographic Score — GTA 5, an electronic album released in March 2014, comprises tracks composed and produced by Tangerine Dream founder Edgar Froese; and Welcome to Los Santos, released with the Microsoft Windows version of the game, features songs from the in-game radio station "The Lab", produced by The Alchemist and Oh No. A series of singles from the Grand Theft Auto Online expansion The Contract, produced and performed by Dr. Dre, were released in February 2022. Critical reception to the soundtracks was positive, as reviewers felt that the music connected appropriately with the gameplay.

Production and composition 

Grand Theft Auto V uses an original score, unlike most of its predecessors. Music supervisor Ivan Pavlovich summarised the original score idea as "daunting", because it was unprecedented for a Grand Theft Auto game. Like most previous series entries, the game uses licensed music tracks provided by an in-game radio as well. Pavlovich hoped that the original score would enhance the licensed music use, not detract from it. He further noted the balancing act between the score's "ambient subtext and tensions" and the game's onscreen action. To work on the score, Rockstar engaged The Alchemist, Oh No and Tangerine Dream with Woody Jackson, who had previously worked on Red Dead Redemption, L.A. Noire and Max Payne 3s music. The team of producers collaborated over several years to create more than twenty hours of music that scores both the game's missions and dynamic gameplay throughout the single-player and multiplayer modes.

Early in the game's development, the music team were shown an early build before starting work on the score. Their work was mostly complete later in development but they continued composing until its final build was submitted for manufacturing. Edgar Froese, Tangerine Dream's founding member, initially rejected the offer of producing music for a video game. After he was flown to the studio and shown the game, he was impressed by its scale and cinematic nature, and changed his mind. Froese's first eight months of work on the score produced 62 hours of music. He recorded with Tangerine Dream in Austria but further work was conducted at Jackson's United States studio, which The Alchemist and Oh No used as well.

Jackson's initial role was to provide score for Trevor's missions, and he took influence from artists such as The Mars Volta and Queens of the Stone Age. When he learnt that the team would be building off each other's work, he voiced concern that the finished product could be disjointed. After sharing his work with the team, he was particularly impressed by Froese's contributions. "Edgar evolved the music, made it into a whole other thing", Jackson said. Froese had interpolated funk sounds with Jackson's hip-hop influences. Froese and Jackson then sent their work between The Alchemist and Oh No, who heavily sampled it. The Alchemist opined, "We were sampling, taking a piece from here, a piece from there ... We pitched stuff up, chopped it, tweaked it. Then we chose the tracks that worked and everyone came in and layered on that". DJ Shadow then mixed the team's creations together and matched it to the gameplay. Pavlovich considered "how to make the hip-hop and rock score not sound like they were instrumentals of songs on the radio, but rather something unique to the score" a challenge.

Pavlovich found that while Rockstar assigned the team missions to write music for, some of their random creations influenced other missions and sparked inspiration for further score development. He discussed a "stem-based" system used to make music fit dynamic game factors where the team would compose music to underscore outcomes players could make immediately after completing missions. Each of these stems, Froese reflected, included up to 62 five-minute WAV files, which were sent to Pavlovich in New York. "He then created, very professionally, a mix down for each of the eight stems needed for a mission and sent out the material to the other artists involved", Froese elaborated. Oh No drew from scenes within the game to make his work feel contextually pertinent with the action onscreen. The iconographic introduction of Los Santos early in the game, for example, inspired him to "create a smooth West Coast vibe that embodied" the city. He supplied horns, electric and bass guitars, and percussion parts to fit with the car chase scenes. "We wanted everything to set the right tone", he explained.

The Rockstar team wanted to synergise the game world's depiction of California with the radio stations by licensing tracks that imparted an appropriate "Cali feel". Pavlovich noted that Los Angeles' cultural saturation of pop music necessitated the Non-Stop-Pop FM station; he said that "the first time you get off an airplane in L.A. and you hear the radio and the pop just seeps out ... We wanted that. It really connects you to the world". He felt that greater discernment was required for licensed music choices than in Grand Theft Auto IV because Grand Theft Auto Vs music plays a pivotal role in generating Californian atmosphere. Music "reflects the environment in which the game is set", he said. Initially, the team planned to license over 900 tracks for the radio but they refined the number to 241. The tracks are shared between fifteen stations, with an additional two talk-back stations and a radio station for custom audio files on the PC version. Some tracks were written specifically for the game, such as rapper and producer Flying Lotus' original work composed for the FlyLo FM station he hosts. Pavlovich noted how the team would first develop an idea of what each station would sound like, and then select a DJ to match the station's genre, such as Kenny Loggins who hosts the classic rock station Los Santos Rock Radio. He felt that to strike a balance between the radio and the score was a meticulous process, and cited a scenario where players would drive to a mission objective while listening to the radio, with the score taking over once players left the vehicle and proceeded to the mission's next stage.

Soundtracks

The Music of Grand Theft Auto V 

The Music of Grand Theft Auto V was released digitally on 24 September 2013, in three volumes, including an original score composed for the game in addition to selections from songs that were licensed for the in-game radio. The retail version of the soundtrack was released on 9 December 2014, for CD and vinyl through Mass Appeal Records.

In the context of the game, The Music of Grand Theft Auto V was well received. Jim Sterling of Destructoid considered the game's sound design "impeccable", directing praise at the score. The staff at Edge wrote that the licensed music "enrich[es] Los Santos' already remarkable sense of space" and considered that the original score enhanced the atmosphere of the gameplay, retrospectively noting Carolyn Petit of GameSpot also thought that the score "lends missions more cinematic flavour", while Jeff Gerstmann of Giant Bomb said that the score helped enhance dramatic tension during missions. Keza MacDonald of IGN commented that the licensed music had been selected well, and agreed that the original score "builds tension" on missions. Alex Young of Consequence of Sound considered the score "dynamic to say the least", praising the music for its appropriation within the gameplay. He concluded that the team have "craft[ed] an entertaining blend of musical tastes that everyone can get on board with". Tshepo Mokoena of The Guardian deemed the soundtrack "inaccessibly trendy at points, but varied enough". The album peaked at 11 on Billboards Top Soundtracks charts in the week of 12 October 2013.

The Cinematographic Score — GTA 5 

The Cinematographic Score — GTA 5 was released on 24 March 2014, limited to 2000 copies. The album was composed and produced by Tangerine Dream founder Edgar Froese, while his wife Bianca Acquaye provided the cover art and acted as executive producer. Froese agreed to work on the game despite his distaste for the medium, intrigued by Grand Theft Auto Vs philosophy of "working against the establishment", describing it as "a social game".

Welcome to Los Santos 

Welcome to Los Santos (also known as The Alchemist and Oh No Present Welcome to Los Santos) was included with the Microsoft Windows version of Grand Theft Auto V, which was released on 14 April 2015. The album was put onto a fictional in-game radio station called "The Lab" to fit with the rest of the in-game music. A retail version of the album was released on 21 April through Mass Appeal Records. David Jeffries of AllMusic felt that the album "captures the excitement of flipping the radio dial in the game". Pitchfork Media's Clayton Purdom praised the album's variety of artists and genres, calling it "music blooming out of a club you are supposed to want to go into". Andrew Matson of NPR spoke positively of most of the album's tracks, though felt that some were "unconsidered, and ... never jells as a result". The album peaked at 18 and 41 on Billboards Top Soundtracks and R&B Albums charts, respectively, in the week of 9 May 2015.

Singles

GTA Online: The Contract 
A new radio station was added to Grand Theft Auto Online in its The Contract update in December 2021, featuring music from Dr. Dre who was also featured in-game. The songs from the radio station were released digitally as singles in February 2022, under the collective name GTA Online: The Contract, and published by Aftermath Records and Interscope Records.

Radio station music
Since the game's location is modelled on Southern California, the developers attempted to create an accurate representation that represented that region. Production of the soundtrack also consisted of licensing music for the radio stations, and selecting a disc jockey that matches the genre of music the station hosts. The soundtrack consists of a wide variety of radio stations that play different genres of music, including reggae, hip hop, hardcore punk, pop and country. In September 2014, it was announced that new songs would be added to some of the radio stations in the next-gen releases of the game.

In developing the radio stations, the development team sought to reinforce the game's recreation of California by licensing tracks they felt appropriately echoed a "Cali feel". On the inclusion of the pop station Non-Stop-Pop FM, music supervisor Ivan Pavlovich noted "the first time you get off an airplane in L.A. and you hear the radio and the pop just seeps out... We wanted that. It really connects you to the world". He felt that music licensing for the game involved a greater discernment than in Grand Theft Auto IV, as the music in Grand Theft Auto V played a greater role in building a Californian atmosphere. "It reflects the environment in which the game is set", he explained. Initially, the team planned to license over 900 tracks for the radio, but over time they refined the total number of tracks to 241.

The tracks are shared between 18 stations, including two talk radio stations. Some of the tracks were written specifically for the game; for example, rapper and producer Flying Lotus hosts the station FlyLo FM which includes original work he composed for the game. For each of the radio stations, over time the team would develop an understanding of where the station's music was going and then select a DJ to host the station. Each station's DJ was selected with the mindset that they would match the genre of music the station hosts; for example, in developing Los Santos Rock Radio the team licensed classic rock tracks and it was decided that Kenny Loggins was a fitting choice as the station's DJ.

References

External links
 Official website

Music
2013 soundtrack albums
Grand Theft Auto music
Oh No (musician) albums
The Alchemist (musician) albums
Albums recorded at Electro-Vox Recording Studios